The Republic of Stellaland was, from 1882 to 1883, a Boer republic located in an area of British Bechuanaland (now in South Africa's North West Province), west of the Transvaal. After unification with the neighbouring State of Goshen, it became the United States of Stellaland from 1883 to 1885.

During its short history, the small state became a focal point for conflict between the British Empire and the South African Republic, the two major players vying for control of the territory. After a series of claims and annexations, British fears of Boer expansionism led to its demise and, among other factors, set the stage for the Second Boer War.

Background
Before the proclamation of the republic, the area was under the control of competing Korana and Tswana groups, while the United Kingdom laid claim to it as a part of the emerging protectorate of British Bechuanaland. Two of the indigenous groups were under the leadership of chiefs Mankoroane and Montšioa, whom the British regarded as "friendly," and two others under the leadership of chiefs Moshette (a Motswana) and Massouw (a Korana). When a feud erupted between Mankoroane and another chief, each side resorted to recruiting volunteers, promising them land in return for their assistance. After a settlement was negotiated with mediation from the Transvaal Republic, large portions of Mankoroane's land with 416 farms of 3,000 morgen (2,563 ha) each were given to Boer mercenaries who had fought on his adversary's side, and the new inhabitants decided to declare independence.

Unification

The Republic of Stellaland was created on 26 July 1882, under the leadership of its elected president Gerrit Jacobus van Niekerk, a farmer from Transvaal, and was given the name Stellaland (Star Land) in reference to a comet that was visible in the skies at the time. The town of Vryburg was founded and declared its capital.

The State of Goshen, named after the biblical Land of Goshen, was founded by Nicolaas Claudius Gey van Pittius in October 1882 in the neighbouring area called Rooigrond with the approval of chief Moshette.

In 1883, Stellaland merged with Goshen united to form the United States of Stellaland.

Status
Whether or not the independence of any of these states was ever recognised by another country is not clear. In Stellaland's favour, one can point out that the Montevideo convention which formalised the definition of sovereignty in the modern sense would not be signed until 1933, and that the local chiefs approved its existence. On the other hand, several British sources refer to Van Niekerk and his followers as "freebooters" and "marauders", but de jure recognition from the United Kingdom can be implied from a telegram that was erroneously sent by Sir Charles Warren, military commander for British Bechuanaland, to Van Niekerk in which he endorsed Cecil Rhodes' settlement in Stellaland. Only later did Warren realise that his wording could be interpreted as an acknowledgement of Stellaland's legality, and he tried to deny the message's implications. In February 1884, Great Britain unilaterally declared the area a British protectorate.

Stellaland's laws and constitution were practically identical to those of the South African Republic. It never issued an independent currency, but instead—like all the surrounding states—used the South African pound; it did, however, print its own postage stamps beginning in February 1884 which are still traded among collectors to the present day.

Annexation
Because Van Niekerk's government had announced its intention to levy taxes on all trade going through its territory, Cecil Rhodes, founder of the De Beers diamond company, and the British administration feared a setback for their endeavours in the mining business, because Stellaland lay on one of the main trade routes. It was also presumed that the small country could eventually be incorporated into the neighbouring South African Republic in an effort to circumvent the Pretoria Convention of 1881 which called for an end to Boer expansionism.

Rhodes even asserted that the area was of such a crucial nature to the Crown that if the territory held by Stellaland remained under Boer control, British presence "should fall from the position of a paramount state in South Africa to that of a minor state." These fears were fuelled when, on 10 September 1884, President Paul Kruger of Transvaal declared the area to be under the protection of the South African Republic and annexed it six days later. In December 1884 the British sent in a force under Sir Charles Warren, who invaded the country and abolished the republic in August of the following year before it was incorporated into British Bechuanaland.

In current politics
Beginning in 2008, the far-right political group Afrikaner Weerstandsbeweging (Afrikaner Resistance Movement) started lobbying for the area to be re-established as an independent Boer republic. According to the group's former leader, Eugène Terre'Blanche, the group is in possession of the old contracts of 1882 that conferred ownership of the area and has vowed to take their case to the International Court of Justice in The Hague if necessary.

On 4 May 2014, the Front National political party said they want to call for restitution of the Republic of Stellaland.

See also

 Postage stamps and postal history of Stellaland Republic
Flag of Stellaland
Coat of arms of Stellaland

References

19th century in Africa
Former countries in Africa
History of South Africa
History of Botswana
States and territories established in 1882
Former republics